Line 4 is a rapid transit line on the Kunming Metro, serving the city of Kunming, China. It was opened on 23 September 2020.

Opening timeline

Stations

References

04